Michael Graff  is a co-author and one of several architects of BIND 9.

In April 1994, he co-authored The Magic Words are Squeamish Ossifrage.

Graff graduated from Iowa State University with a degree in Computer Engineering. He is currently working at Internet Systems Consortium, a non-profit corporation.

References

External links
Iowa State University
Internet Systems Consortium

Living people
Computer engineers
Iowa State University alumni
American software engineers
Year of birth missing (living people)